Lisa Pratt is a biogeochemist and astrobiologist who previously served as the 7th Planetary Protection Officer for NASA from 2018 to 2021 under President Donald Trump. Her academic work as a student, professor, and researcher on organisms and their respective environments prepared her for the position, in which she is responsible for protecting the Earth and other planets in the solar system from traveling microbes. Originally, Pratt did not see a place for herself in science, but with encouragement from her academic mentors and family members along the way, she has been able to accomplish much work as a scientist. She is currently a Provost Professor Emeritus of Earth and Atmospheric Sciences for Indiana University Bloomington

Early life and education
Lisa Pratt was born and raised in Rochester, Minnesota. At her high school in Minnesota, Pratt took a lot of science courses up until her senior year.  However, when she began college, she was determined not to pursue a degree in science because she felt women were not welcome in the field. Her father had been a surgeon at the Mayo Clinic, and she noted that none of his peers were female-identifying. Pratt first began her undergraduate education at Rollins College studying Spanish. However, she later transferred to University of North Carolina, where she began studying botany.

Pratt received her Bachelor's of Arts in botany from the University of North Carolina in 1972. In 1974 she received her Masters of Science from the University of Illinois in Botany. Pratt later entered the field of geology by earning her Masters of Science from the University of North Carolina in 1978 and her Doctorate Degree from Princeton University in 1982.

Academic career 
After receiving her PhD in 1982, Pratt held a post-doctoral fellowship for two years at the U.S. Geological Survey in Denver and stayed on for an additional five years as a Research Geologist in the U.S.G.S. Branch of Petroleum Geology before leaving Colorado for a junior professorship in biogeochemistry at Indiana University in 1987 to help train young scientists for careers in the petroleum exploration and extraction industry.
 
She currently serves as a Provost Professor Emeritus of Earth and Atmospheric Sciences for Indiana University Bloomington where she has been a faculty member since 1987. Since joining Indiana University's faculty, Pratt has focused her research on how extreme environments effect the microorganisms within them.

Projects 
When Pratt was a doctoral student, her work focused on the periods of time when Earth's oceans were starved for oxygen, which led to oceanic anoxic events that led to the creation of black sediment deposits. In doing so, she looked at the geological record of planet Earth to better understand what had taken place millions of years ago. Later, as Pratt was completing her post-doctoral work at the U.S. Geological Survey in Denver, she was brought on for a project in which she studied microorganisms in the extreme heat of active African gold mines. This was significant as it led to NASA looking to bring Pratt in to help study the microorganisms effected on their future projects. This project led to NASA funding one of her projects In 2011, in which she received a $2.4 million grant from NASA's Astrobiology Science and Technology for Exploring Planets program to study microorganisms on the Greenland Ice Sheet.

While Pratt has been a faculty member for Indiana University at Bloomington since 1987, she has a history of working with NASA since the early 2000s. She served as a team director at the NASA Astrobiology Institute from 2003 to 2008. Pratt also served as a chair for NASA's Mars Exploration Program Analysis from 2013 to 2016, and currently serves as a chair for the Return Sample Science Board for the Mars 2020 Rover mission.

In June 2017, the application for the position of Planetary Protection Officer was posted, but Pratt was hesitant to apply. She says that encouragement from her daughter led to her submitting her name, and on February 5, 2018, Pratt was also brought on to serve as the Planetary Protection Officer for NASA, leaving her role as Indiana University's College of Arts and Sciences dean to do so. She was one out of a rumored 1,400 applicants who very vying for the position to actually attain it. She had two responsibilities at NASA: first, protecting the Earth in event of extraterrestrial involvement, and second, ensuring that Earth's microbes do not travel and impact other planets in the solar system. Her research at NASA focuses on the developing the tools and techniques needed to avoid organic-constituent and biological contamination during either human or robotic missions. Additionally, Pratt was responsible for updating planetary policies in response to changing federal legislation.

In May 2021, President Biden announced the appointment of J. Nick Benardini to replace Pratt as Planetary Protection Officer effective the following month.

Awards and honors 
 Bicentennial Medal at Indiana University (2020)
 President's Medal for Excellence at Indiana University (2018)
National Association of Science Teachers, Shell Science Seminar Featured Speaker, 2015  
 Phi Beta Kappa Triennial Council Meeting, featured lecture, 2012
 Fellow Geological Society of America, 2010
 Phi Beta Kappa Visiting Scholar, 2009-2011
 Indiana University College of Arts and Sciences Alumni, Distinguished Faculty Member, 2003
American Association of Petroleum Geologists, Eastern Section, Outstanding Educator, 2002
 Association of Women Geoscientists, Outstanding Educator, 1997
 Distinguished Lecturer, American Association Petroleum Geologists, 1990-1991
 Matson Award American Association of Petroleum Geologist, 1986
National Research Council Post-Doctoral Fellow 1982-1984

Audio/Video interviews

References 

Living people
Year of birth missing (living people)
Place of birth missing (living people)
Indiana University Bloomington faculty
NASA people
Astrobiologists
University of North Carolina alumni
University of Illinois alumni
Princeton University alumni
American women biologists
Fellows of the Geological Society of America
Planetary scientists
Women planetary scientists
Biogeochemists
21st-century American women